Walid Mohamed Kandel El-Said (born 24 March 1985) is an Egyptian former footballer who is last known to have played as a defender for Limanovia Limanowa.

Career

Club career

Kandel started his career with Egyptian top flight side Zamalek. In 2007, he signed for Tersana in the Egyptian top flight. Before the second half of 2012–13, Kandel signed for Egyptian second-tier club Sohag. Before the second half of 2013–14, he signed for UKS Łady in the Polish fifth tier after trialing for Polish top flight team Jagiellonia Białystok. In 2014, Kandel signed for Limanovia Limanowa in the Polish third tier, where he suffered relegation to the Polish sixth tier due to sponsorship problems.

International career

He represented Egypt at the 2005 FIFA World Youth Championship.

References

External links
 

Egyptian footballers
Living people
Egyptian expatriate sportspeople in Poland
II liga players
Association football defenders
Egypt youth international footballers
1985 births
Zamalek SC players
Egyptian Premier League players
Expatriate footballers in Poland
Limanovia Limanowa players
Tersana SC players
Ghazl El Mahalla SC players